Patriarch John XI may refer to:

 John XI Yeshu, Syriac Orthodox Patriarch of Antioch in 1208–1220
 John XI of Constantinople, Ecumenical Patriarch in 1275–1282
 Pope John XI of Alexandria, Pope of Alexandria & Patriarch of the See of St. Mark in 1427–1452
 John XI Helou, Maronite Patriarch of Antioch in 1809–1823